Xenoleini is a tribe of longhorn beetles of the subfamily Lamiinae. It was described by Lacordaire in 1869.

Taxonomy
 Hirtaeschopalaea Pic, 1925
 Paraxenolea Breuning, 1950
 Xenolea Thomson, 1864

References

Lamiinae